The Luscombe Phantom was a 1930s American two-seat cabin monoplane and the first product of the Luscombe Aircraft Engineering Company.

Design and development
Donald A. Luscombe formed the Luscombe Aircraft Engineering Company in 1933 at Kansas City, Missouri. The Phantom or Model 1 was the first aircraft built by the company, and first flew in 1934. It was a high-wing braced monoplane with conventional fixed tail-wheel landing gear, and was powered by a nose-mounted 145 hp (108 kW) Warner Super Scarab radial engine. The fully enclosed engine cowling, with individual air vents for each cylinder, was unusual for a US radial engine light aircraft. Apart from the fabric wing surfaces, the aircraft was all-metal, and had a luxury interior with two side-by-side seats in an enclosed cabin. All compound curves were formed by one employee, Nick Nordyke. As a luxury aircraft, it failed to sell in the economical climate of 1930s America, and the company went on to develop cheaper and simpler aircraft.

Specifications

See also

References

Notes

Bibliography

 
 
  (World War II story of female US aviator, with pictures of Luscombe Phantom)

1930s United States civil utility aircraft
Phantom
High-wing aircraft
Single-engined tractor aircraft
Aircraft first flown in 1934